The Amphicat is a six-wheel-drive, skid steer amphibious all-terrain vehicle invented in Spain by José Artés de Arcos, manufactured in the late 1960s through the early 1970s by Mobility Unlimited Inc. of Auburn Hills, Michigan.  The product line was purchased by “Magna American” (a division of “Magna Corporation”) which produced the vehicle in Raymond, Mississippi for several years. The vehicle was also made in Canada by Behoo Industries and differed slightly from its American counterpart, mostly on the transom.

The Canadian version of the Amphicat was featured as the moon buggy used by Moonbase Alpha personnel in the television series Space: 1999 and the US version as the Banana Splits' cars in the TV show Banana Splits. It also appeared in the TV series Lancelot Link, Secret Chimp and in an episode of Blake's 7.

Technical details
 Body: Vacuum-formed Marbon Cycolac ABS plastic
 Engine: 16 hp (12 kW) air-cooled 2-cycle recoil start gasoline engine
 Transmission  –  Ontario Drive & Gear Limited (ODG) manufactured a special transmission capable of forward and reverse for the Amphicat. ODG would use this experience to introduce their own Argo ATVs.
 Clutches  –  automatic torque converter for driving, disc-type for steering
 Brakes  –  band type on drum
 Tires  –  specially designed 11.5x20 Amphicat tubeless tires

References

External links
Amphicat 6x6 ATV info
UTV Accessories & Parts
Joe's Garage Amphicat Page
Route6x6.com's Amphicat Page
Aftermarket UTV/ATV accessories&parts provider

ATVs
Six-wheeled vehicles
Wheeled amphibious vehicles